Emílio Lino (8 June 1916 – 3 March 1958) was a Portuguese fencer. He competed in the individual and team épée events at the 1948 Summer Olympics.

References

External links
 

1916 births
1958 deaths
Sportspeople from Lisbon
Portuguese male épée fencers
Olympic fencers of Portugal
Fencers at the 1948 Summer Olympics